In enzymology, an alanine-oxo-acid transaminase is an enzyme that catalyzes the chemical reaction

L-alanine + a 2-oxo acid  pyruvate + an L-amino acid

Thus, the two substrates of this enzyme are L-alanine and 2-oxo acid, whereas its two products are pyruvate and L-amino acid.

This enzyme belongs to the family of transferases, specifically the transaminases, which transfer nitrogenous groups.  The systematic name of this enzyme class is L-alanine:2-oxo-acid aminotransferase. Other names in common use include L-alanine-alpha-keto acid aminotransferase, leucine-alanine transaminase, alanine-keto acid aminotransferase, and alanine-oxo acid aminotransferase.  This enzyme participates in alanine and aspartate metabolism.  It employs one cofactor, pyridoxal phosphate.

References

 
 
 
 

EC 2.6.1
Pyridoxal phosphate enzymes
Enzymes of unknown structure